Psychotronics or psychotronic may refer to:

 Psychotronics (parapsychology), a Czech term for research and development in parapsychology
 Psychotronic harassment, aka electronic harassment
Psychotronic Video, a magazine about cult film genres such as horror, exploitation, action, and science fiction

See also
The Psychotronic Man, a 1980 American science fiction film